The 2021 MotoE World Cup (known officially as the 2021 FIM Enel MotoE World Cup for sponsorship reasons) was the third season of the MotoE World Cup for electric motorcycle racing, and was part of the 73rd F.I.M. Grand Prix motorcycle racing season.

The Cup was won by Spanish rider Jordi Torres for the second consecutive season at the final round in Misano.

Teams and riders 
All teams used the series-specified Energica Ego Corsa.

Rider changes
Alex de Angelis announced his retirement from motorcycle racing at the end of 2020.
Alessandro Zaccone moved from Gresini Racing to replace de Angelis at Pramac.
Andrea Mantovani made his full season debut with Gresini Racing to replace Alessandro Zaccone.
Yonny Hernández made his class debut, replacing Joshua Hook at Pramac, and returning to the MotoGP paddock for the first time since 2017.
Eric Granado moved from Esponsorama Racing to WithU Motorsport, replacing Jakub Kornfeil.
André Pires made his class debut with Esponsorama Racing, replacing Granado.
Corentin Perolari made his full season debut with Tech3 to replace Tommaso Marcon.
Rookies Miquel Pons and Kevin Zannoni joined LCR E-Team to replace Xavier Siméon and Niccolò Canepa.
Hikari Okubo joined Avant Ajo MotoE for his debut in the class, replacing Niki Tuuli.
Jasper Iwema made his debut in the class with Pons Racing 40 adding a second bike, marking his first return to the MotoGP paddock since 2015.
Fermín Aldeguer entered the class to replace compatriot Alejandro Medina at Aspar.

Team changes 
 Marc VDS and their rider Mike Di Meglio left the class for 2021, citing scheduling conflicts with Di Meglio's Endurance World Championship entries.
Pons Racing added a second entry in the grid vacancy left by Marc VDS' withdrawal.

Mid season changes
Mattia Casadei missed the Austrian round due to him testing positive for COVID-19. He was replaced by Stefano Valtulini for the round.

Regulation changes
On weekends with two races, the E-Pole qualifying session would determine the starting grid for both races. Previously, the starting grid for the second race was based on the results of the first race.

Calendar
The 2021 MotoE provisional calendar was released on 11 November 2020, featuring 7 races at 6 venues, supporting the Spanish, French, Catalan, Dutch, Austrian and San Marino Grand Prix—the latter being a double header.

Results and standings

Grands Prix

Cup standings
Scoring system
Points were awarded to the top fifteen finishers. A rider had to finish the race to earn points.

References 

Grand Prix motorcycle racing seasons